Munir Ahmed Dar may refer to 

Munir Dar (cricketer) (born 1974), cricketer from Hong Kong
Munir Dar (field hockey) (born 1935), Pakistani field hockey player